Mart Laar's first cabinet was in office in Estonia from 22 October 1992 to 8 November 1994, when it was succeeded by Andres Tarand's cabinet.

Members

This cabinet's members were the following:

References

Cabinets of Estonia